The Arrondissement of Antwerp is one of the three administrative arrondissements in Antwerp Province, Belgium. It is both an administrative and a judicial arrondissement. The territory of the Judicial Arrondissement of Antwerp coincides with that of the Administrative Arrondissement of Antwerp.

History
The Arrondissement of Antwerp was created in 1800 as the first arrondissement in the Department of Deux-Nèthes. It originally comprised the cantons of Antwerp, Boom, Berchem, Brecht, Ekeren and Zandhoven. In 1923, the then municipalities of Burcht and Zwijndrecht (Burcht was merged into Zwijndrecht in 1977 to form the present-day municipality of Zwijndrecht) in the Arrondissement of Sint-Niklaas were added to the arrondissement.

Municipalities
The Administrative Arrondissement of Antwerp consists of the following municipalities:

 Aartselaar
 Antwerp
 Boechout
 Boom
 Borsbeek
 Brasschaat
 Brecht
 Edegem
 Essen
 Hemiksem

 Hove
 Kalmthout
 Kapellen
 Kontich
 Lint
 Malle
 Mortsel
 Niel
 Ranst
 Rumst

 Schelle
 Schilde
 Schoten
 Stabroek
 Wijnegem
 Wommelgem
 Wuustwezel
 Zandhoven
 Zoersel
 Zwijndrecht

References 

Antwerp